NGC 468 is a spiral galaxy in the constellation Pisces. Located approximately 209 million light-years from Earth, it was discovered by John Frederick William Herschel in 1827.

See also 
 List of galaxies
 List of spiral galaxies

References

External links 
 
 Deep Sky Catalog
 SEDS

468
Pisces (constellation)
Spiral galaxies
004780